Ranjith Pathegama Gamage, a Fellow of the Australian Academy of Technology and Engineering, is an Australian academic based at Monash University, where he holds the position of Professor in Geomechanics Engineering. His research has significantly influenced understanding of the Carbon sequestration. He has also developed new sustainable technologies for extracting resources (e.g. minerals) from deep earth and natural gas from coal seams, shale, and tight geological formations.

Early life and education 
Gamage was born in Sri Lanka and he received his BSc in Engineering (with a UNESCO Gold Medal) from the University of Moratuwa, after which he gained a PhD from Wollongong University, Australia. His PhD was on the “Stress-strain and permeability characteristics of two-phase (water+gas) flow through fractured rocks”. His first job after the PhD was as an assistant professor at Nanyang Technological University, Singapore. He returned to Australia in 2003 to work at Monash University.

Academic and research career 
Gamage is the founder and director of the Deep Earth Energy Research Lab at Monash University. His research areas include Carbon sequestration, unconventional oil, unconventional gas (shale gas, tight gas, coal seam gas, gas hydrate), deep geothermal energy, geomechanics, rock mechanics, enhanced oil recovery (EOR) methodologies, hydraulic fracturing, sand production from unconsolidated reservoirs, and future technologies for in-situ mining. He has also done substantial work in converting industrial waste products into useful and environmentally sustainable materials, such as cement or fertiliser. Around 2015 he began developing a new product for sustainable deep earth resource recovery: called SREMA

Brief list of academic activities: 
Serves as the Editor-in-Chief of the journal: Geomechanics and Geophysics for GeoEnergy and GeoResource.
Founder and Chair of the International Conference on Geomechanics for GeoEnergy and GeoResources (IC3G) which runs every two years.

Patents 
Slow Releasing Material Agent (SREMA) for rock breaking: For sustainable mining and hydrocarbon recoveries ( Patent No. USA:10 836 955B2).

Awards and honours 
2020: Fellow of Institute of Materials, Minerals and Mining (IOM3), UK.
2020: Fellow of Geological Society, UK.
2020: Global leader in Mining and Mineral Resources (one of the 9 global filed leaders).
2020: finalist for 2020 R&D 100 Awards.
2019: elected as a Fellow of the Australian Academy of Technology and Engineering.
2017: Elsevier Scopus award for Sustainability.
2013: the Australian Leadership award.
2009: an Australian Research Council Future Fellowship for his research work to combat climate change.
Fellow of the American Society of Civil Engineers (ASCE) and Engineers Australia.

References

External links 
http://www.3gdeep.com/
https://www.springer.com/engineering/civil+engineering/journal/40948
http://www.ic3g.com/2018/index.php

Year of birth missing (living people)
Living people
Academic staff of Monash University
Fellows of the Australian Academy of Technological Sciences and Engineering
Sinhalese academics
Alumni of the University of Moratuwa
University of Wollongong alumni
Academic staff of Nanyang Technological University
Sri Lankan emigrants to Australia
Australian expatriates in Singapore
Fellows of the American Society of Civil Engineers
Academic journal editors